Mud Butte is a former village, now a diffuse unincorporated community, located in northern Meade County, South Dakota, United States. It roughly lies along U.S. Route 212, 55 miles northeast of the city of Sturgis.  Its elevation is 2,871 feet (875 m). Mud Butte lies within ZIP code 57758, which is served by the post office at Opal.

History
Mud Butte was named from a barren butte nearby that had the color of dark mud.
A rare Tyrannosaurus skeleton was found at Mud Butte in the 1980s.

References

Unincorporated communities in Meade County, South Dakota
Unincorporated communities in South Dakota